Hoyt Radio Tower is the tallest man-made structure in Colorado and one of the tallest structures in the world.

It was built in 2003 by Acme Towers, LLC, and is currently owned and operated by the Denver Radio Tower Company for FM-broadcasting, stations KJHM and KFCO, as well as emergency services.  Unlike shorter towers, which are painted red and white in seven alternating bands for aircraft warning, the Hoyt Radio Tower is unpainted and uses strobe lights for aircraft warning.

External links 
 
 
 http://skyscraperpage.com/diagrams/?buildingID=56858
 http://wireless2.fcc.gov/UlsApp/AsrSearch/asrRegistration.jsp?regKey=2635358 

Towers in Colorado
Radio masts and towers in the United States
Towers completed in 2003
2003 establishments in Colorado
Buildings and structures in Morgan County, Colorado